The 2017 season was Djurgårdens IF's 117th in existence, their 62nd season in Allsvenskan and their 17th consecutive season in the league. They were competing in Allsvenskan and Svenska Cupen and qualified for the 2018–19 UEFA Europa League.

Squad

Out on loan

Transfers

Winter

In:

 

Out:

Summer

In:

Out:

Competitions

Allsvenskan

Results summary

Results by round

League table

Results

2016–17 Svenska Cupen

Group stage

2017–18 Svenska Cupen

Group Stages took place during the 2018 season.

Squad statistics

Appearances and goals

|-
|colspan="14"|Players away from Djurgårdens on loan:

|-
|colspan="14"|Players who left Djurgårdens during the season:

|}

Goal scorers

Disciplinary record

References

External links
Official Website

Djurgårdens IF Fotboll seasons
Djurgårdens IF season